Tągowie  (Kashubian Togòmié, German: Tangen) is a village in the administrative district of Gmina Tuchomie, within Bytów County, Pomeranian Voivodeship, in northern Poland. The village has a population of 215.

For details of the history of the region, see History of Pomerania.

References

Villages in Bytów County